Richard C. Gamble is a reformed theologian and a professor. He is the Professor of Systematic Theology at Reformed Presbyterian Theological Seminary in Pittsburgh. He formerly served as an adjunct professor at Puritan Reformed Theological Seminary and Westminster Theological Seminary, a professor at Reformed Theological Seminary, Calvin Theological Seminary, and Westminster Theological Seminary in Philadelphia.
He wrote the articles on Brevitas et Facilitas as the hermeneutical method of John Calvin. He is also an author, his most notable work being "The Whole Counsel Of God" Volumes 1, 2, and 3.

Education

 Universitat Basel, Switzerland, Th.D.
 Pittsburgh Theological Seminary, MA
 Westminster College, BA

Teaching career

 Professor of Systematic Theology, Reformed Presbyterian Theological Seminary
 Professor, Reformed Theological Seminary (1997-2005)
 Professor of Historical Theology and Director of the Henry Meeter Center for Calvin Studies, Calvin Theological Seminary (1987-1997)
 Professor, Westminster Theological Seminary (1981-1987)
 Scholar in residence, Great Lakes Gulf Presbytery, RPCNA
 Guest lecturer in Church History at the Freie Evangelisch-Theologische Akademie in Riehen, Switzerland (1977-1980)
Other Career Highlights:
 Ordained in the Orthodox Presbyterian Church
 Senior Pastor, Teaching Elder, Associate Pastor, and church planter for churches in Michigan, Pennsylvania, and Florida
 President of Calvin Studies Society
 Member of the Editorial Board of The Peter Martyr Library
 Internationally recognized Calvin scholar; in July 2009 was a special lecturer for the Calvin500 celebration in Geneva, Switzerland
Publications:
 Editor or author of more than 100 publications, including The Whole Counsel of God (his multi-volume systematic theology), Calvin's Old Testament Commentaries, A Handbook for Calvin’s Institutes, and Calvin and the Church.

See also
 Brevitas et facilitas

References

 Myung Jun Ahn, "The influences on Calvin's hermeneutics and the development of his method", HTS Teologiese Studies / Theological Studies; Vol 55, No 1 (1999), 228-239.
 Ahn Myung Jun, "The ideal of Brevitas et Facilitas: the theological hermeneutics of John Calvin",  Skrif en Kerk Volume 20 Issue 2 (1999)

American Calvinist and Reformed theologians
University of Basel alumni
Pittsburgh Theological Seminary alumni
Living people
Year of birth missing (living people)
21st-century Calvinist and Reformed theologians
Westminster Theological Seminary faculty